William Greenwood (10 April 1798 – 9 June 1872) was an amateur English cricketer who made his first-class debut for Marylebone Cricket Club (MCC) in 1818, playing a single match for the club against Hampshire.

Ten years after his last first-class appearance, Greenwood represented Hampshire in a single first-class match against an early England XI in 1828.

Greenwood died at Brookland Park, Kent on 9 June 1872.

External links
William Greenwood at Cricinfo
William Greenwood at CricketArchive

1798 births
1872 deaths
English cricketers
Marylebone Cricket Club cricketers
Hampshire cricketers
English cricketers of 1787 to 1825